Sutherlands is a town in South Australia. This was a much larger area than surveyed in the 2021 census of 33 people.

Once the centre of a small farming community, today Sutherlands has a pub and a few houses still occupied. Formerly serviced by the Eudunda - Morgan railway, access is gained via the Thiele Highway bitumen road.

References

Towns in South Australia